Mathias Alain Fischer (born 11 July 1998) is a French professional footballer, who plays as a defender for Bourg-en-Bresse.

Career
Fischer made his professional debut with AS Nancy in a 2–1 Ligue 2 loss to US Quevilly-Rouen on 9 February 2018.

References

External links
 
 
 
 
 

Living people
1998 births
Sportspeople from Colmar
Association football defenders
French footballers
France youth international footballers
AS Nancy Lorraine players
USL Dunkerque players
FC Villefranche Beaujolais players
Football Bourg-en-Bresse Péronnas 01 players
Ligue 2 players
Championnat National players
Championnat National 3 players
Footballers from Alsace